Benjamin Dalley (15 March 1916 – 19 March 2005) was an Australian water polo player who competed in the 1948 Summer Olympics.

See also
 Australia men's Olympic water polo team records and statistics
 List of men's Olympic water polo tournament goalkeepers

References

External links
 

1916 births
2005 deaths
Australian male water polo players
Water polo goalkeepers
Olympic water polo players of Australia
Water polo players at the 1948 Summer Olympics
Water polo players from Sydney
Australian Army personnel of World War II
Australian Army officers